The Safe Harbor Bridge also known as the Safe Harbor Trestle, Port Road Bridge and the Enola Low Grade Line (A&S Railroad) Steel Trestle  is a steel deck truss trestle that spans the Conestoga River at Safe Harbor, Pennsylvania near the Susquehanna River for the Port Road Branch and the former Columbia and Port Deposit Railroad along the Susquehanna River. It was built in 1905 for the Atglen and Susquehanna Branch (A&S), also known as the "Low Grade Branch", of the Pennsylvania Railroad (PRR).

There is one more bridge at this site, the Safe Harbor Dam access road bridge.
The lower span was raised  in 1930, concurrent with the construction of the Safe Harbor Dam. In 1976 the PRR lines became part of Conrail, which abandoned the A&S branch in 1989. The tracks were removed from the upper bridge in 1990. The upper portion has been repurposed to serve as part of the Enola Low Grade Trail.

See also
List of bridges documented by the Historic American Engineering Record in Pennsylvania
List of crossings of the Conestoga River

References

External links

Bridge photos
Trestle Construction*Safe Harbor Trestle Bridge on Flickr - by Veender
Atglen & Susquehanna Branch

Bridges over the Conestoga River
Bridges in Lancaster County, Pennsylvania
Railroad bridges in Pennsylvania
Historic American Engineering Record in Pennsylvania
Norfolk Southern Railway bridges
Pennsylvania Railroad bridges
Steel bridges in the United States
Girder bridges in the United States
Pratt truss bridges in the United States
Trestle bridges in the United States